Gang Ranch Airport, formerly , was a registered aerodrome located adjacent to Gang Ranch, British Columbia, Canada.

References

Defunct airports in British Columbia
Thompson-Nicola Regional District